The Salas River is a tributary of the Lima. It rises in the Larouco mountains (:pt:Serra do Larouco), within the municipality of Baltar, Ourense, Galicia. It flows through the territory of the Couto Misto, a former independent state, and the Portuguese village of Tourém (:pt:Tourém) before being dammed up by the Encoro de Salas, back in Spain.  It flows into the Limia River near the town of Lobios.

Rivers of Spain
Rivers of Galicia (Spain)
Rivers of Portugal
International rivers of Europe